Make-A-Wish UAE is charity organization in the United Arab Emirates that grants the wishes (experiences) of children with life-threatening medical conditions. Make-A-Wish UAE is an affiliate of Make-A-Wish Foundation.

Awards 
 Winner of "Local Foundation of the Year" at the Middle East Philanthropy Awards 2013

References 
 Worldwish.org,. 'The Make-A-Wish Story | Make-A-Wish International'. N.p., 2015. Web. 29 Aug. 2015.
 Make A Wish UAE,. 'Make A Wish UAE'. N.p., 2015. Web. 29 Aug. 2015.

Charities based in the United Arab Emirates